Mian Muhammad Akhtar Hayat is a Pakistani politician who had been a member of the Provincial Assembly of the Punjab from August 2018 till January 2023. Mian Akhter Hayat is a retired police officer of Pakistan and he has also served as an assistant collector in Punjab.

Early life and education
He was born on 1 October 1950 in Kharian Tehsil, Pakistan.

He has a degree of Bachelor of Arts.

Political career

He was elected to the Provincial Assembly of the Punjab as a candidate of Pakistan Tehreek-e-Insaf from Constituency PP-32 (Gujrat-V) in 2018 Pakistani general election.

References

Living people
Punjab MPAs 2018–2023
Pakistan Tehreek-e-Insaf MPAs (Punjab)
1950 births